The Tehachapi Unified School District is a school district in the  Tehachapi, California area with approximately 4,900 students.  Stacey Larson-Everson is the district's Superintendent. Mr. Jeff Kermode is President of the Board of Education.

The Tehachapi Unified School District has 6 schools:
 2 high schools, including an alternative education high school
 1 middle school
 3 elementary schools

Schools

High school
Tehachapi High School

Alternative Education School
Monroe High School

Middle school
Jacobsen Middle School

Elementary schools
Cummings Valley Elementary School
Golden Hills Elementary School 
Tompkins Elementary School

References

External links

School districts in Kern County, California
Tehachapi, California